Villa Piovene is a Palladian villa built in Lugo di Vicenza, province of Vicenza, northern Italy. The building was commissioned in the 16th century for the aristocratic Venetian Piovene family, their architect believed to have been Andrea Palladio. It is part of the World Heritage Site "City of Vicenza and the Palladian Villas of the Veneto" since 1996.

History 

Villa Piovene was built around 1539–40 in competition to and within the immediate vicinity of Villa Godi, which rises only a few hundred metres. Rivalries have been proven to exist between the Piovene and Godi noble families. The villa was the ambitions of Battista Piovene and his son Tommaso Piovene, the latter was probably responsible for commissioning the structure. The Piovene family seemed less interested in matching the size of Villa Godi as they were in the choice of the artisan workshop carrying out the work, that of Giovanni di Giacomo da Porlezza, who also was responsible for the execution of Villa Godi, of the Pedemuro workshop, where Andrea Palladio was employed.

More doubts than certainties surround Palladio's involvement in the execution of the Villa. First of all, the building was not included in the Quattro libri dell'architettura (published 1570), although other certainly autograph villas were also excluded (such as the Villa Gazzotti or the Villa Valmarana at Vigardolo). But it is the characteristics of the building itself which are most perplexing: the plan is hardly sophisticated, the windows pierce the façade without any particular order, and the pronaos is awkwardly joined to the building block.

Architecture

The villa is certainly the product of three campaigns of work: documents demonstrate the existence of a manorial house, smaller than the present one and certainly constructed before 1541, which was enlarged at a later stage by the addition of the pronaos bearing the inscribed date 1587: so the loggia that projects in the center—six Ionic columns supporting a triangular gable—may have begun by Palladio around 1570 and completed after his death. The extension of the mansion and the vertical window rhythms can also be assumed to have taken place within the 1570s in accordance with Palladio's wishes, though not carried out by him. 

Finally, in the first half of the 18th century, the architect Francesco Muttoni constructed the actual lateral barchesse (side farm wings), laid out the garden and probably executed the double-ramp stairs which lead to the loggia. The scenographic stair by which one accedes to the villa, however, was certainly realised some years prior together with the handsome gate of 1703.

Today, the villa is seen against a picturesque backdrop of a garden, which was laid out in the 19th century, situated in the plain of the Astico River. In 1996, UNESCO included the building within the World Heritage Site "City of Vicenza and the Palladian Villas of the Veneto".

See also

Palladian Villas of the Veneto
Palladian architecture

References
 Villa Piovene in the CISA (Centro internazionale di studi di architettura Andrea Palladio) website

Andrea Palladio buildings
Piovene
Palladian villas of Veneto